The 2017–18 season will be Fudbalski klub Partizan's 71st season in existence and the club's 12th competing in the Serbian SuperLiga.

Transfers

In

Out

Players

Squad

Friendlies

Competitions

Serbian SuperLiga

Overview

Regular season

League table

Results

Championship round

Results

Serbian Cup

UEFA Champions League

Second qualifying round

Third qualifying round

UEFA Europa League

Play-off round

Group stage

Results

Round of 32

Statistics

Goalscorers

Last updated: 23 May 2018

Clean sheets

Last updated: 17 May 2018

Disciplinary record

- They left the team during the season
Last updated: 23 May 2018

References

External links

 Partizanopedia 2017-18

FK Partizan seasons
Partizan
Partizan